Albany is a city in Stearns County, Minnesota, United States. The population was 2,561 at the 2010 census. It is part of the St. Cloud Metropolitan Statistical Area.

History

Albany was incorporated in 1890.

Geography

Interstate 94/U.S. Highway 52 and Minnesota State Highway 238 are two of the main routes in the city.

Other nearby routes include Stearns County Roads 10, 41, 54, and 157.

Education
The Albany Area Public School District, District #745, is a consolidated school district with a middle school serving grades 6–8, and a high school serving grades 9–12, located in Albany.  The Albany Elementary School serves grades E–5, and is on the same campus site as the middle school and high school.  Another elementary school in the district, Avon Elementary School, serves children in Preschool through Grade 5, and is six miles east of Albany in nearby Avon.  A successful building referendum in August 2015 resulted in security upgrades to all schools, expanded classroom space, a new theatre, and a new community center. Holy Family School, a K–6 Roman Catholic parochial school, is also in Albany.

Politics
Albany is part of Minnesota House District 12B, which is represented by Paul Anderson (R); and Minnesota Senate District 12, which is represented by Torrey Westrom (R).

Albany is also part of Minnesota's 7th congressional district, currently represented in the U.S. Congress by Representative Michelle Fischbach (R).

Demographics

As of 2000 the median income for a household in the city was $31,577, and the median income for a family was $41,118. Males had a median income of $31,858 versus $18,966 for females. The per capita income for the city was $16,383. About 6.0% of families and 10.3% of the population were below the poverty line, including 12.0% of those under age 18 and 14.1% of those age 65 or over.

2010 census
As of the census of 2010, there were 2,561 people, 1,030 households, and 657 families residing in the city. The racial makeup of the city was 97.6% White, 0.2% African American, 0.2% Native American, 0.2% Asian, 0.7% from other races, and 1.0% from two or more races. Hispanic or Latino of any race were 0.9% of the population.

There were 1,030 households, of which 36.3% had children under the age of 18 living with them, 48.4% were married couples living together, 10.6% had a female householder with no husband present, 4.8% had a male householder with no wife present, and 36.2% were non-families. 30.2% of all households were made up of individuals, and 16.4% had someone living alone who was 65 years of age or older. The average household size was 2.41 and the average family size was 3.01.

The median age in the city was 33.4 years. 27.3% of residents were under the age of 18; 7.5% were between the ages of 18 and 24; 29.3% were from 25 to 44; 17.7% were from 45 to 64; and 18.2% were 65 years of age or older. The gender makeup of the city was 46.9% male and 53.1% female.

Sports and recreation
The Lake Wobegon Trail Marathon runs through Albany each year in May. The marathon was first run in 2008.

Notable people
 James Steven Rausch – (1928–1981), Roman Catholic Bishop; born in Albany.
 Ed Schrom - (1911-1980), Minnesota state senator and farmer; born in Albany.

References

External links 

Cities in Minnesota
Cities in Stearns County, Minnesota
St. Cloud, Minnesota metropolitan area
Populated places established in 1890
1890 establishments in Minnesota